Yonghegong Lama Temple station is an interchange station on Line 2 and Line 5 of the Beijing Subway.

Station Layout 
Both the Line 2 and 5 stations have underground island platforms.

Exits 
There are 6 exits, lettered A, B, C, E, F, and G. Exits C, E, and F are accessible.

Gallery

See also
Yonghe Temple (also called Lama Temple)

References

External links
 

Railway stations in China opened in 1984
Beijing Subway stations in Dongcheng District